The Renovation is a 2020 Finnish comedy film directed by Taneli Mustonen. It tells the story of a couple, Jalmari and Maija, who inherit a house in need of a major renovation, taking the situation to catastrophic proportions. Sami Hedberg and Kiti Kokkonen starred in the main roles of the film, in addition to which Hedberg portrays numerous supporting characters.

The film is a Finnish remake of the 2018 Norwegian film Norske byggeklosser, which in turn is a remake of the 1972 film of the same name. Director Taneli Mustonen says he got the idea for the film while presenting his Bodom film at the South by Southwest Film Festival in Austin, Texas, where he met Norwegians who were excited about the Norske Byggeklosser they produced. He later reached an agreement to direct the Finnish version. The house to be renovated in the film is located in Viljandi, Estonia. In addition to Estonia, the film was shot in Vihti, Finland.

The Renovation premiered on February 19, 2020. Despite poor reviews (of which Episodi magazine and Film-O-Holic website, for example, rated it one star out of five), the film has been an audience success and exceeded 100,000 viewers in Finland in 11 days.

Cast 
 Sami Hedberg as Jalmari / Mischa / Pirkka / bank manager / waste management worker / explosive man / tractor driver
 Kiti Kokkonen as Maija
 Rea Mauranen as Oili
 Kari Ketonen as Folke
 Hannu-Pekka Björkman as construction inspector
 Inka Kallén as Teresa
 Jukka Rasila as official
 Jarmo Koski as foreman

References

External links 

Se mieletön remppa at Nordisk Films Finland (in Finnish)

2020 comedy films
2020 films
Finnish comedy films
Remakes of Norwegian films
Films directed by Taneli Mustonen